Hellcat or The Hell Cat may refer to:

Arts and entertainment

Film and television 
 The Hell Cat (1918 film)
 The Hell Cat (1934 film) 
 The Hellcat, a 1928 British silent film
 The Hellcats, a 1967 outlaw biker film, featured on the television series Mystery Science Theater 3000
 Hellcats (film), a 2008 South Korean film
 Hellcats, a 2010 TV series starring Alyson Michalka
"Hellcat", a 1966 episode of Iron Horse (TV series)

Music
 Hellcat, a guitar made by Schecter Guitar Research
 Hellcat Records, an American record label based in California
 Hellcat (EP), an EP by Meisa Kuroki

Other entertainment
 Hellcat (comics), the code name of Patsy Walker, a fictional Marvel Comics character
 Hellcat (Dungeons & Dragons), a type of evil creature related to devils
 Hell Cat, a wooden roller coaster at Clementon Amusement Park

Military / firearms
 Grumman F6F Hellcat, the primary United States Navy aircraft carrier fighter in the second half of World War II
 M18 Hellcat, a United States tank destroyer used in World War II.
 12th Armored Division (United States), nicknamed the Hellcat Division (or Hellcats for short)
 Short Hellcat, a planned air-to-surface variant of the Seacat missile
 Springfield Armory Hellcat, a 9mm pistol made by Springfield Armory, Inc.

Transport 

Chrysler Hemi Hellcat, a supercharged engine option of the following vehicles
 Dodge Charger SRT Hellcat
 Dodge Challenger SRT Hellcat
 Jeep Grand Cherokee SRT Trackhawk
 Melling Hellcat, a sports car

Other uses
 Mary Todd Lincoln, nicknamed "Hellcat"
 Hellcat Swamp, a section of the Parker River National Wildlife Refuge

See also 
 "The Cat from Hell", a short story by Stephen King